Ni Duan ((1436–1505), style name as Zhongzheng (仲正), was an imperial Chinese painter in the Ming Dynasty.

Ni Duan as born in Hangzhou. He excelled in paintings of people and landscapes.

Notes

Ming dynasty landscape painters
1436 births
1505 deaths
Artists from Hangzhou
Painters from Zhejiang